Paratilapia sp. nov. 'Lac Ihotry' is a formally undescribed species of fish in the family Cichlidae. It is endemic to Madagascar.  Its natural habitats are rivers and freshwater lakes. It is threatened by habitat loss.

Sources
 Loiselle, P. & participants of the CBSG/ANGAP CAMP "Faune de Madagascar" workshop 2004.  Paratilapia sp. nov. 'Lac Ihotry'.   2006 IUCN Red List of Threatened Species.   Downloaded on 4 August 2007.

Paratilapia
Freshwater fish of Madagascar
Undescribed vertebrate species
Taxonomy articles created by Polbot